Edward Shaske (20 December 1927 – 28 December 2021) was a Canadian sports shooter. He competed in the trap event at the 1968 Summer Olympics. Shaske died on 28 December 2021, at the age of 94.

References

External links
 

1927 births
2021 deaths
Canadian male sport shooters
Olympic shooters of Canada
Shooters at the 1968 Summer Olympics
Sportspeople from Edmonton
20th-century Canadian people